The William F. Norton House is a historic house at 1 Stanley Avenue in Kingfield, Maine.  Built in 1900 by brothers William and Lavella Norton, it is a particularly elaborate example of Queen Anne architecture in a rural setting with a square tower believed to be unique in the state.  The house was listed on the National Register of Historic Places in 1982.  It now houses a restaurant and bed and breakfast inn.

Description and history
The Norton House is set on the east side of Stanley Avenue, a residential side street just outside the village center of Kingfield.  It is a -story wood-frame structure, with a complex cross-gable configuration that includes a prominent three-story square tower with an elaborate woodwork parapet at the top.  The building is finished in a combination of shingling (including decorative cut shingles at the higher levels) and clapboards, and rests on a granite foundation.

The house was built in 1900-01 by Lavella Norton, a master builder whose other local works include the Amos G. Winter House and Webster Hall.  The interior woodwork was executed by Norton's brother William, and includes a molded oak arch, a multi-wood parquet floor in the dining room, and kitchen cabinetry and molding of birdseye maple.

The house is now a bed and breakfast inn and restaurant.

See also
National Register of Historic Places listings in Franklin County, Maine

References

External links
One Stanley Avenue web site

Houses on the National Register of Historic Places in Maine
Queen Anne architecture in Maine
Houses completed in 1900
Houses in Franklin County, Maine
Bed and breakfasts in Maine
National Register of Historic Places in Franklin County, Maine